Jungle Ka Qanoon is 1995 Pakistani double version political action film directed by Masood Butt and produced by Safdar Khan. The film stars actors Nadeem, Ghulam Mohiuddin, Sultan Rahi and Humayun Qureshi.

Cast
 Sultan Rahi
 Nadeem
 Izhar Qazi
 Saima
 Reema
 Nargis
 Albela
 Abid Ali
 Bahar Begum
 Humayun Qureshi
 Tariq Shah
 Shafqat Cheema
 Adeeb
 Altaf Khan
 Zahir Shah
 Nasrrullah Butt

Crew
Writer - Nasir Adeeb
Producer - Safdar Khan
Production Company - Shama Parwana Pictures
Cinematographer - Masud Butt
Music Director - M. Ashraf
Lyricist - Saeed Gillani, Khawaja Pervez
Playback Singers - Noor Jehan, Saira Naseem

Awards
This film won a total of 7 awards as listed below:
Nigar Award for 'Best Film of 1995' in the Punjabi-language category.
Nigar Award 'Best Director', Masood Butt in the Punjabi-language category
Nigar Award 'Best Scriptwriter', Nasir Adeeb in the Punjabi-language category
Nigar Award 'Best Actress', Reema Khan in the Punjabi-language category
Nigar Award 'Best Supporting Actor', Humayun Qureshi in the Punjabi-language category
Nigar Award 'Best Music Director', M. Ashraf in the Punjabi-language category
Nigar Award 'Best song writer, Khawaja Pervez in the Punjabi-language category

References

External links

Pakistani political films
Pakistani action films
1995 films
Punjabi-language Pakistani films
1990s Urdu-language films
Nigar Award winners
1990s Punjabi-language films
Political action films
Urdu-language Pakistani films